The Changi Exhibition Centre (CEC) (Chinese: 樟宜会展中心) is a convention center in Singapore located on a plot of land just beyond the northern edge perimeter fencing of the new Changi Air Base (East).  It is the home of the Singapore Airshow, which has been held at the venue since 2008. Changi Exhibition Centre is owned and managed by Experia Events Pte Ltd.

History 
Changi Exhibition Centre was originally purpose-built in 1988 to host the Asian Aerospace, an event which was held in Singapore. However, in 2007, disagreements with co-show organiser Reed Exhibitions led to Asian Aerospace pulling out. In the wake of this division, a separate company, Experia Events Pte Ltd, was formed to take ownership of Changi Exhibition Centre and continue the task of building Singapore into a world-class aviation hub by building the Singapore Airshow from scratch.

Specifications
The CEC is built on a 30-hectare site off Aviation Park Road, on reclaimed land to cater for future expansion of Singapore Changi Airport. Aviation Park Road, a new service road built to serve the site, branches off from Changi Coast Road and was specially built to double-up as a taxiway linking the site with the runway at Changi Air Base (East). This provision allows exhibition aircraft to arrive and depart without disrupting operations in Changi Airport.

The fully air-conditioned exhibition hall itself has a total gross floor area of 40,000 m2, spread over three halls on the first floor and a mezzanine floor. The three main exhibition halls has a continuous H-shaped layout which can be segregated, and includes halls A (14,660 m2), B (3,200 m2) and C (16,000 m2) for a total of 33,860 m2 of space. Nine function rooms ranging in size from 60 m2 to 330 m2 are located within Hall A, covering a total of 1,905 m2. The mezzanine floor offers an additional 3,870 m2 of space.

The outdoor exhibition space includes a front plaza measuring 298 by 94 metres in size, and an outdoor display area 355 by 259 metres in size, both of which are located adjacent to the exhibition hall. Outdoor exhibition chalets are located along the waterfront beside the outdoor display area. In all, 100,000 m2 of outdoor exhibition space is available, equivalent to 33 soccer fields and can house ten Boeing 747s at a time.

A total of 2,000 open-air car parking spaces are available on site.

Usage
Changi Exhibition Centre. It is the home of the biennial Singapore Airshow, which it has since been held for six editions since 2008.

In between these events, the show site becomes a venue for car-related events. Several brands including BMW, Audi, Mercedes-Benz, Lexus, Mitsubishi, Ariel and Porsche have held events there, most in the form of private driving experiences. It also played host to the Formula Drift Competition in 2008 and the Shell Eco Marathon in 2017 and 2018.

The International Maritime Defence Exhibition and Conference (IMDEX) Asia, held biennially, which had been held at the Changi Naval Base, was shifted here in 2011. Since then, it has been held at the CEC on every two years.

Experia Events Pte Ltd, the same company that runs Singapore Airshow and IMDEX Asia, launched Rotorcraft Asia and Unmanned Systems Asia in 2017, which were also held together at the CEC.

In response to the COVID-19 pandemic, the Changi Exhibition Centre was repurposed into a community isolation facility to house those who patients who were displaying mild symptoms of the COVID-19 disease, accepting its first patients on 25 April. It was set up by a task force comprising nine MINDEF-affiliated organisations along with partners  such as the Dormitory Association of Singapore, Experia Events and Surbana Jurong. The remodeled facility can accommodate about 2,700 patients, and is currently undergoing an expansion of its outdoor area to accommodate an additional 1,700 patients. Its operations are managed by Mandarin Oriental Singapore and Raffles Medical Group. 

Changi Exhibition Centre was also used for the filming of Third Rail, a drama show that was aired on Mediacorp Channel 5.

References

External links
Official site

Changi
Convention centres in Singapore